Student Pugwash may refer to:
 International Student/Young Pugwash, an international student organization
 Student Pugwash USA, a US student organization